Charles W. "Lefty" Marr (September 19, 1862 in Cincinnati – January 11, 1912 in New Britain, Connecticut) was a professional baseball player who played outfield and third base in the Major Leagues from 1886 to 1891. He would play for the Cincinnati Red Stockings (AA/NL), Columbus Solons, and Cincinnati Kelly's Killers.

See also
List of Major League Baseball annual triples leaders

External links

1862 births
1911 deaths
Major League Baseball right fielders
Major League Baseball third basemen
Baseball players from Cincinnati
Cincinnati Kelly's Killers players
Cincinnati Red Stockings (AA) players
Cincinnati Reds players
Columbus Solons players
19th-century baseball players
Evansville (minor league baseball) players
Nashville Americans players
Syracuse Stars (minor league baseball) players
Spokane Bunchgrassers players
Butte (minor league baseball) players
Macon Central City players
Macon Hornets players
Sioux City Cornhuskers players
Nashville Seraphs players
St. Paul Apostles players
Portsmouth Browns players
Richmond Bluebirds players
Richmond Giants players
Hartford Bluebirds players
New Britain Rangers players
Hartford Cooperatives players
Allentown Peanuts players
Norfolk Jewels players
Minor league baseball managers